UWSP is an abbreviation of:

 United Wa State Party, a Burmese political organization
 University of Wisconsin–Stevens Point, a public university in Stevens Point, Wisconsin
 University of Warwick Science Park, a university-based science park in the United Kingdom